The City of Essendon was a local government area about  northwest of Melbourne, the state capital of Victoria, Australia.

History

Essendon was first incorporated as a borough on 27 December 1861. It became a town on 10 January 1890, and was proclaimed a city on 16 April 1909.

Essendon initially incorporated the suburbs of Flemington and Kensington, but these suburbs split away to form the Borough of Flemington and Kensington on 17 March 1882, which merged in 1905 with the City of Melbourne. In 1993, Essendon once again gained parts of Flemington and Kensington, as well as parts of North Melbourne, from the City of Melbourne. The Royal Melbourne Showgrounds, however, was annexed to Melbourne.

On 15 December 1994, the City of Essendon was abolished, and along with suburbs of the City of Keilor east of the Albion-Jacana freight railway line, was merged into the newly created City of Moonee Valley.

The former is now a performing arts centre while the latter is the headquarters for the City of Moonee Valley.

The telephone exchange codes for this area began 37x. Until the 1960s, it was covered by the alphabetical exchange code FU (translating to 37 on the keypad).

Wards

On 1 October 1979, the City of Essendon was subdivided into four wards:

 Aberfeldie Ward
 Ascot Vale Ward
 Essendon Ward
 Moonee Ponds Ward

At dissolution, each ward elected three councillors.

Suburbs
 Aberfeldie
 Ascot Vale
 Essendon
 Essendon North
 Flemington (a small triangle between the Flemington Racecourse railway line, Epsom Road and Ascot Vale Road)
 Kensington (shared with the City of Melbourne)
 Moonee Ponds*
 North Melbourne (shared with the City of Melbourne)
 Strathmore
 Strathmore Heights

* Council seat.

Population

* Estimate in the 1958 Victorian Year Book.
+ The area annexed in 1979 contained a further 8,892 people, so the combined figure is 60,025.

References

External links
 Victorian Places - Essendon and Essendon City

Essendon
1861 establishments in Australia
1994 disestablishments in Australia
Essendon, Victoria